Respect: The Very Best of Aretha Franklin is a 2002 greatest hits album by American soul singer Aretha Franklin. It was released on June 3, 2002.

Track listing
Disc 1
"Respect" – 2:25
"Think" – 2:16
"Spanish Harlem" – 3:29
"(You Make Me Feel Like) A Natural Woman" – 2:45
"I Say a Little Prayer" – 3:33
"Son of a Preacher Man" – 3:16
"I Never Loved a Man (The Way I Love You)" – 2:49
"Chain of Fools" – 2:46
"Don't Play That Song (You Lied)" – 2:59
"Angel" – 4:27
"Border Song (Holy Moses)" – 3:20
"Rock Steady" – 3:12
"See Saw" – 2:43
"The House That Jack Built" – 2:19
"Oh No Not My Baby" – 2:51
"Until You Come Back to Me (That's What I'm Gonna Do)" – 3:25
"Good Times" – 2:06
"Since You've Been Gone (Sweet Sweet Baby)" – 2:22
"You're All I Need to Get By" – 3:34
"Ain't Nothing Like the Real Thing" – 3:47
"Do Right Woman (Do Right Man)" – 3:13
"Share Your Love with Me" – 3:18
"Something He Can Feel" – 6:15
"Ain't No Way" – 4:13

Disc 2
"Sisters Are Doin' It for Themselves" – 4:15
"I Knew You Were Waiting (For Me)" – 4:00
"Through the Storm" – 4:20
"Love All the Hurt Away" – 4:07
"Willing to Forgive" – 4:09
"Let It Be" – 3:29
"Never Let Me Go" – 2:52
"Night Time Is the Right Time" – 4:45
"Call Me" – 3:53
"Drown in My Own Tears" – 4:03
"People Get Ready" – 3:41
"My Song" – 3:29
"Dark End of the Street" – 4:40
"Today I Sing the Blues" – 4:22
"A Rose Is Still a Rose" – 3:58
"Who's Zoomin' Who" – 4:42
"Freeway of Love" – 4:10
"Day Dreaming" – 3:56
"Bridge over Troubled Water" – 5:34

Charts and certifications

Weekly charts

Year-end charts

Certifications

References

2002 greatest hits albums
Aretha Franklin compilation albums
Warner Music Group compilation albums